The 21st Artistic Gymnastics World Championships were held in Moscow, the capital of the USSR, in November 1981. The championships were originally meant to be hosted in Mexico City, but financial difficulties caused Mexico to withdraw as hosts in March of that year. The event was given to the Soviet Union instead.

Medal winners

Men

Team final

All-around

Floor exercise

Pommel horse

Rings

Vault

Parallel bars

Horizontal bar

Women

Team final

All-around

Apparatus

Vault qualification

Vault final

Uneven bars qualification

Uneven bars final

Balance beam qualification

Balance beam final

Floor exercise qualification

Floor exercise final

Medals

References

Gymn Forum: World Championships Results
Gymnastics

World Artistic Gymnastics Championships
World Artistic Gymnastics Championships
World Artistic Gymnastics Championships
International gymnastics competitions hosted by the Soviet Union